Jessica Forever is a 2018 French fantasy sci-fi drama film written and directed by 
Caroline Poggi and Jonathan Vinel. The film premiered as the closing film of the Platforms section of the 2018 Toronto International Film Festival. It also showed in the Panorama section of the 69th Berlin International Film Festival in 2019.

Plot
As a leader of a group of lost boys, Jessica, a loving and compassionate person, needs to lead them to a place where peace and harmony exists. Her goal is to create a world where Julien, Kevin, Lucas, Michael and Raiden, can live in peace together, and forever.

Cast
Aomi Muyock as Jessica
Sebastian Urzendowsky as Michael
Augustin Raguenet as Lucas
Lukas Ionesco as Julien
Eddy Suiveng as Kevin
Paul Hamy as Raiden
Maya Coline as Camille
Angelina Woreth as Andréa
Théo Costa-Marini as Trésor
Franck Falise as Sasha
Florian Kiniffo as Magic
Jordan Klioua as Dimitri
Ymanol Perset as Léopard
Jean-Marie Pittilloni as Maxime
Iliana Zabeth as ice cream seller
Ilyess Meftahi as party boy 1
Corentin Bachelair as party boy 2
Bastien Austruy as party boy 3
Christian Desole as boatmaster
Abel Mandico as voice of magic water

Reception

Pat Mullen of POV praised the lead actress, writing "Jessica Forever features a heroic woman of the Lara Croft variety leading a group of lost boys through a world in which orphans are hunted, but the film proves too sparse and thinly conceived for its ambiguously open premise to be remotely intriguing or effective".

Jonathan Romney of Film Comment wrote that "Jessica Forever isn't primarily about effects or action - it's largely about feelings, and surprisingly delicate feelings at that".

According to Rafael Motamayor of Bloody Disgusting, "[the film] starts up with a promising premise that it abandons after 5 minutes in favor of following the most boring group of characters in recent memory".

Lena Wilson of The Playlist gave the film a "D" rating, explaining her reasoning by writing that "Jessica Forever has a few delightfully experimental moments – birthday cake letters and self-immolation make for some stunning visuals – but it quickly dovetails into nonsense". She also added that "[t]here are movies, like I Think We're Alone Now and Annihilation" that according to her "use sci-fi strangeness to enhance their dramatic potential and further captivate the audience".

References

External links

2010s fantasy drama films
2018 science fiction films
2018 drama films
French fantasy drama films
French science fiction drama films
2010s French films